Gérard Dubi (born November 27, 1943) is a retired Swiss professional ice hockey forward. He played almost his entire career for Lausanne HC, apart from the 1969-70 season when he played for Genève-Servette HC. He also represented the Swiss national team at the 1972 Winter Olympics.

References

External links

Gérard Dubi's stats at Sports-Reference.com

Living people
Swiss ice hockey forwards
1943 births
Genève-Servette HC players
Ice hockey players at the 1972 Winter Olympics
Lausanne HC players
Olympic ice hockey players of Switzerland